Chelsea Scott Cooley Altman  (born October 30, 1983) is an American actress, singer, model and beauty pageant titleholder who has competed in the Miss Teen USA, Miss USA and Miss Universe pageants and who has held the Miss USA 2005 title.

As Miss USA, Cooley represented the Miss Universe Organization. Her "sister" 2005 titleholders were Natalie Glebova (Miss Universe, of Canada) and Allie LaForce (Miss Teen USA, of Ohio). She raised $22.8 million for breast- and ovarian-cancer research during her time as Miss USA.

Pageant competitions

Miss North Carolina Teen USA, Miss North Carolina USA
Cooley won the Miss North Carolina Teen USA 2000 title and represented North Carolina in the Miss Teen USA 2000 pageant, but did not place. Cooley first entered the Miss North Carolina USA pageant in 2004, where she placed first runner-up to Ashley Puleo. Puleo went on to place second-runner up at the Miss USA 2004 pageant. The following year, Cooley won the Miss North Carolina USA 2005 title on her second attempt.

Miss USA 2005 pageant
Cooley represented North Carolina in the Miss USA 2005 pageant broadcast live from Baltimore, Maryland on April 21, 2005. For her final question, Cooley drew the question of former Miss USA Shandi Finnessey. She was asked: "What famous person does your personality most parallel?" Her answer was: "I guess it would be Oprah. She has a passion for life. She loves what she does, and she works so hard to try to achieve everything in her life... I try to emulate myself after that."

Miss Universe 2005 pageant
Cooley competed as Miss USA in the Miss Universe pageant held in Bangkok, Thailand on May 31, 2005. The eventual winner of that pageant was Natalie Glebova of Canada.

As Miss USA

Within days of her pageant win in Baltimore, Cooley moved to a Trump Tower apartment in New York City which she shared with Miss Universe and Miss Teen USA during her reign. Cooley then traveled to Thailand to compete in the Miss Universe pageant, and she and newly crowned queen Natalie Glebova stayed in Thailand for a week after the competition.

Post-pageant
Cooley expressed a desire to move into the entertainment industry after passing on her crown.

Cooley is the president of an image consulting company, StandOut. Productions.

References

External links

 
 StandOut Productions, Cooley's personal business
 Miss USA official website
 Miss North Carolina USA and Teen USA official website
 Interview on PageantCast episode #2

1983 births
Actresses from Charlotte, North Carolina
American beauty pageant winners
Beauty pageant contestants from North Carolina
Female models from North Carolina
Living people
Miss North Carolina USA winners
2000 beauty pageant contestants
20th-century Miss Teen USA delegates
Miss Universe 2005 contestants
Miss USA 2005 delegates
Miss USA winners
20th-century American people